is Japanese manga series written and illustrated by Hideki Arai. It was serialized in Shogakukan's seinen manga magazine Weekly Big Comic Spirits from 1995 to 1996, with its chapters collected in six tankōbon volumes. It was adapted into a live action film, which premiered in Japan in September 2018.

Media

Manga
Written and illustrated by Hideki Arai, Itoshi no Irene was serialized in Shogakukan's seinen manga magazine Weekly Big Comic Spirits from 1995 to 1996. Shogakukan collected its chapters in six tankōbon volumes, released from September 30, 1995, to November 30, 1996.  republished the series in two volumes on December 5, 2003. Ohta Publishing republished the series in a two-volume edition, which included a 16-page epilogue chapter, on December 15, 2010, and January 20, 2011.

Volume list

Live action film
A live action film adaptation was announced in February 2018. The film, directed by Keisuke Yoshida, stars Ken Yasuda as Iwao Shishido and Philippine actress Nats Sitoy as Irene Gonzalez. The film premiered in Japan on September 14, 2018.

References

Further reading

External links
 

Seinen manga
Shogakukan manga
Japanese romantic drama films